Foster Leroy Witherup (July 26, 1886 – December 13, 1941) was a professional baseball pitcher. He played all or part of three seasons in Major League Baseball between 1906 and 1909 for the Boston Beaneaters (1906) and Washington Senators (1908–09). He was born in North Washington, Pennsylvania.

In a three-season career, Witherup posted a 3–12 record with a 4.44 earned run average in 26 appearances, including 17 starts and 12 complete games, giving up 80 earned runs on 189 hits and 47 walks while striking out 71 in  innings of work.

Witherup died in New Bethlehem, Pennsylvania, at the age of 55.

External links

Retrosheet

Major League Baseball pitchers
Boston Beaneaters players
Washington Senators (1901–1960) players
Uniontown Coal Barons players
Trenton Tigers players
Des Moines Boosters players
Baseball players from Pennsylvania
1886 births
1941 deaths